is a Japanese former professional basketball player. He became the first Japanese player to reach 10,000 points in the history of the men's top league.

References

1970 births
Living people
Asian Games bronze medalists for Japan
Asian Games medalists in basketball
Basketball players at the 1994 Asian Games
Basketball players at the 2002 Asian Games
Basketball players at the 2006 Asian Games
Japanese men's basketball players
Levanga Hokkaido players
Nihon University alumni
Nihon University Red Sharks men's basketball players
Sportspeople from Saitama Prefecture
Medalists at the 1994 Asian Games
Shooting guards
People from Ageo, Saitama